Christiane Jaccottet (born Christiane Wachsmuth, Lausanne, Switzerland 18 May 1937; died Rivaz, 26 October 1999) was a harpsichordist who recorded the works of many composers including Johann Sebastian Bach.

Personal life 
She was married to Pierre Jaccottet.

References 

1937 births
1999 deaths
Swiss harpsichordists
20th-century classical musicians